Halifax South was a provincial electoral district in Nova Scotia, Canada, that elected one member of the Nova Scotia House of Assembly. It was formed in 1933 when Halifax County was divided into five distinct districts. It was renamed Halifax City South in 1966, and its boundaries were reformed in 1967 to create the district of Halifax Cornwallis.

Members of the Legislative Assembly 
Halifax South elected the following members to the Nova Scotia Legislature:

Election results

1933 general election

1937 general election

1941 general election

1945 general election

1949 general election

1953 general election

1956 general election

1960 general election

1963 general election

References

Former provincial electoral districts of Nova Scotia